Richler may refer to :

 Daniel Richler (born 1957), a Canadian arts and pop culture broadcaster and writer; son of Mordecai
 Delisle-Richler controversy
 Emma Richler, a Canadian novelist; daughter of Mordecai
 Jacob Richler, a Canadian newspaper and magazine journalist; son of Mordecai
 Mordecai Richler (1931–2001), a Canadian author, Academy Award-nominated screenwriter and essayist
 Nancy Richler, a Canadian novelist; second cousin of Mordecai
 Noah Richler, a Canadian journalist; son of Mordecai

Richler family
Jewish surnames
Yiddish-language surnames